Zotalemimon procerum is a species of beetle in the family Cerambycidae. It was described by Pascoe in 1859. It feeds on the black pepper plant, Piper nigrum.

References

procerum
Beetles described in 1859